Summit Lake is a lake in Unorganized Thunder Bay District in Northwestern Ontario, Canada, about  northwest of the community of Nakina, and  northeast of the Auden and Ombabika stops on the Canadian National Railway transcontinental mainline.

Hydrology
The mouth of the Gripp River is at the southeast corner, and there are four unnamed creeks as secondary inflows. The primary outflows are the Ombabika River, at the southwest corner, and the Powitik River, at the north end of the lake; Summit Lake is the source for both. The former river flows into Lake Nipigon and via the Nipigon River into Lake Superior. The latter flows via the Kapikotongwa River, Little Current River, Kenogami River and Albany River to James Bay. Thus, the lake is in both the Albany River system in the James Bay drainage basin, and the Nipigon River system in the Lake Superior (Great Lakes Basin) drainage basin.

References

Lakes of Thunder Bay District